Sexpedia was a 2015 Hong Kong romantic comedy television series produced by Hong Kong Television Network. The first episode premiered on 13 April 2015.

Over a year after the series was released, rival television station TVB released a similarly themed series, Come with Me, on its online streaming platform.

Cast
 Jason Chan as Dicky Ko Tik, an IT technician suffering from erectile dysfunction
 Joman Chiang as Kuk Choi-yi, a sex toy salesperson
 Jan Tse as Dr Selina Mok Chui-lin, a sex therapist who occasionally acts as a narrator to convey knowledge about sex to the audience
 Alan Luk as Moses Ng 
 Maggie Wong as Milk Ng
 Zeno Koo as Joe Ng
 Calvin Lui as Daniel
 Cherry Pau as Cheung Chin-chin, a registered nurse
 Rachel Lam as Ho Siu-cho, an airline hostess
 Kwok Fung as Kuk Choi-yi's father
 Tong Chun-ming as Nelson, a crossdresser and Selina's husband
 Casper Chan as Toby, a friend of Cheung Chin-chin
 Pancy Chan as Sharon
 Luvin Ho as Peggy
 Anita Kwan as Elaine
 Jacky Yeung as Wallace
 Danel Yu as Cathy, episode 1 and 12
 Franco Chan as Mr. Cho, episode 2
 Eunice Ho as Cheung Lai-fong, episode 2
 Eddie Li as Sunny with premature ejaculation, episode 4
 Karen Lee as Monica, episode 4
 Homan Ho as Mr. Ho, episode 6
 Janice Ting as Mrs. Ho, episode 6
 Leila Tong as herself portraying as Ting Siu-hoi from The Borderline, guest star episode 8
 Lawrence Chou as himself portraying as Choi Ying-yeung from The Borderline, guest star episode 8
 Candy Chu as Sa Sa who is into sadomasochism, episode 8
 Brian Wong as Sa Sa's boyfriend, episode 8
 Nick Chong as Jing, episode 10

Release
A 10-minute preview was released on HKTV's YouTube channel on 1 April 2015.

References

Hong Kong Television Network original programming
2015 Hong Kong television series debuts
2010s Hong Kong television series